Perekopskaya is a rural locality (a stanitsa) in Kremenskoye Rural Settlement, Kletsky District, Volgograd Oblast, Russia. The population was 75 as of 2010. There are 10 streets.

Geography 
Perekopskaya is located in steppe, on the right bank of the Don River, 34 km northeast of Kletskaya (the district's administrative centre) by road. Perekopka is the nearest rural locality.

References 

Rural localities in Kletsky District